Narong Boonfuang (born 13 June 1957) is a Thai boxer. He competed in the men's light welterweight event at the 1976 Summer Olympics. At the 1976 Summer Olympics, he defeated José Manuel Gómet of Spain, before losing to Christian Sittler of Austria.

References

1957 births
Living people
Narong Boonfuang
Narong Boonfuang
Boxers at the 1976 Summer Olympics
Place of birth missing (living people)
Light-welterweight boxers